Rogers High School is a public high school for students in grades nine through twelve located in Rogers, Arkansas.  Rogers High School is managed by the Rogers School District and served by the main feeder schools of Elmwood Middle School and Kirksey Middle School.

History 
 
Established in 1922 to support the education of in Rogers and nearby communities. As of the 2008–09 school year, with the opening of Heritage High School on the site of the Old high school, Rogers High School houses 2,144 students in one building. With the recent increase in students, the Rogers New Tech High School has been opened as one of the high schools now in the Rogers School District.

Curriculum 
The comprehensive curriculum at Rogers High School is accredited by AdvancED and the Arkansas Department of Education (ADE). Students may participate in regular and Advanced Placement (AP) coursework and exams prior to graduation. The Rogers Heritage High School provides approved curriculum approved by the Arkansas Department of Education.  In 2012, Rogers High School was awarded the Silver Award from U.S. News & World Report Top 1,000 High Schools in America with a No. 4 ranking in Arkansas and No. 881 nationally. For 2010, Rogers was ranked No. 1148 in the Newsweek ranking of the top six percent of public high schools.

Extracurricular activities 
The Rogers High mascot is the "Mountaineer"; frequently shortened to "Mountie". The school colors are royal blue and white. Rogers Mounties compete in interscholastic competition at the state's largest classification level (7A) in the 7A West Conference administered by the Arkansas Activities Association (AAA). Activities include baseball, basketball (boys/girls), bowling (boys/girls), competitive cheer, cheer, cross country (boys/girls), competitive dance, dance, debate, football, golf (boys/girls), soccer (boys/girls), softball, speech, swimming (boys/girls), tennis (boys/girls), track (boys/girls), volleyball and wrestling. They also compete in quiz bowl under the Arkansas Governer's Quizbowl Association.

Rogers boasts the state's most successful girls cross country program with a state-record 17 state championships between 1980 and 2011, including six (1980-1985) and five (1989-1993) consecutive titles, respectively. The boy's squad has raced its way to 19 cross country state championships between 1988 and 2017 with seven consecutive banners raised from 2002 to 2008. The girls soccer team has won 4 state titles (2004, 2005, 2006, 2018). The boys' soccer team won the 2017 state title. The girls tennis team won its first state tennis championship in 2012. The girls bowling team won their first state bowling championship in 2012. In baseball, Rogers knocked in a state record 11 home runs, including 6 in a single game in the 1999 state tournament. They have recently become much more successful in quiz bowl, making it to the state finals in 2022 in which they placed 2nd in the televised game against Southside High School.

In 2012, sprinter and former Arkansas Track and Field Walk-On Chase Lamers was awarded the Gatorade State Boys Track & Field Athlete of the Year award.

Notable alumni 

Ryan Hale American football player, New York Giants
Lee Ziemba American football player, Carolina Panthers

References

External links 
 

1922 establishments in Arkansas
Public high schools in Arkansas
Schools in Benton County, Arkansas
Educational institutions established in 1922
Buildings and structures in Rogers, Arkansas